Maurizio Scioscia (born 6 December 1991) is an Italian-German footballer who plays for FV Illertissen II.

Career
He made his 3. Liga debut for 1. FC Heidenheim in September 2012, as a substitute for Marco Sailer in a 2–0 win over SV Darmstadt 98.

External links

Maurizio Scioscia at Kicker

1991 births
Living people
German footballers
German people of Italian descent
1. FC Heidenheim players
Stuttgarter Kickers players
3. Liga players
Regionalliga players
Association football fullbacks